Samuel Morfitt (10 December 1868 – 16 January 1954) was an English rugby union and rugby league footballer who played in the 1880s and 1890s. He played representative level rugby union (RU) for England, Yorkshire and Durham, and at club level for Hull FC, Hull Kingston Rovers (two spells), and West Hartlepool, as a wing, or centre, and club level rugby league (RL) for Hull Kingston Rovers. Prior to the 1895–96 season, Hull F.C. was a rugby union club, and prior to the 1897–98 season, Hull Kingston Rovers was a rugby union club.

Background
Morfitt was born in Hull, East Riding of Yorkshire, his birth was registered in Sculcoates district, and he died aged 85 in Kingston upon Hull, East Riding of Yorkshire, England.

Playing career

International honours
Morfitt won caps for England (RU) while at West Hartlepool in 1894 against Wales, Ireland, and Scotland, and while at Hull Kingston Rovers in 1896 against Wales, Ireland, and Scotland.

In the early years of rugby football the goal was to score goals, and a try had zero value, but it provided the opportunity to try at goal, and convert the try to a goal with an unopposed kick at the goal posts. The point values of both the try and goal have varied over time, and in the early years footballers could "score" a try, without scoring any points.

Change of Code
When Hull Kingston Rovers converted from the rugby union code to the rugby league code for the 1897/98 season, Sammy Morfitt would have been approximately 28 years of age. Consequently, he was both a rugby union and rugby league footballer for Hull Kingston Rovers.

Note
Sammy Morfitt's surname is variously spelt correctly with a 'o' as Morfitt, or incorrectly with a 'u' as Murfitt.

References

External links
Search for "Morfitt" at rugbyleagueproject.org
Search for "Murfitt" at rugbyleagueproject.org
 (archived by web.archive.org) England versus Wales - Lockwood's Game
Search for "Samuel Morfitt" at britishnewspaperarchive.co.uk
Search for "Sammy Morfitt" at britishnewspaperarchive.co.uk
Search for "Samuel Murfitt" at britishnewspaperarchive.co.uk
Search for "Sammy Murfitt" at britishnewspaperarchive.co.uk

1868 births
1954 deaths
Durham County RFU players
England international rugby union players
English rugby league players
English rugby union players
Hull F.C. players
Hull Kingston Rovers players
Rugby union centres
Rugby union wings
Rugby league players from Kingston upon Hull
Rugby union players from Kingston upon Hull
West Hartlepool R.F.C. players
Yorkshire County RFU players